Lukman Adefemi Abegunrin is a Nigerian professional footballer who plays as a forward for Rivers United F.C. in the Nigeria Professional Football League.

Career

Nigeria
Born in Lagos, Nigeria. Lukman emerged through the youth ranks of local academy called Wusu. In 2012, Nigeria Premier league side Crown FC signed Lukman for a season and he made professional debut at the age of 18 years. He was adjudged best youth player for Crown FC.

Serbia
FK Javor Ivanjica scouted talent of Lukman and offered him 1 year deal. In 2013-14 Javor Ivanjica relegated to Serbia first league. In 2014, Lukman came back to Africa.

Mozambique
In 2015, Lukman joined Moçambola giants CD Maxaquene. Lukman finished the season on a high note and become top scorer for Maxaquene. In 2016, Lukman finished runner-up with Maxaquene in Taça de Moçambique.
In 2017, Lukman joined FC Chibuto and had another successful season there. He was then getting offers from European clubs and one of them was Varzim.

Portugal
After his impressive season in Mozambique, Portugal club Varzim signed him on loan where Lukman played for half season and came back to Mozambique and joined Ferroviário.

Oman
In 2019, Lukman joined Oman Professional League club Al-Rustaq for half season of 2018-19. 
In January 2020, Lukman joined another Oman based club Al Diriyah for remainder season of 2019-20.

India
In December 2019, Lukman joined I-League club Real Kashmir FC. In the same month, Real Kashmir won prestigious IFA Shield. He was adjudged man of the tournament and top scorer of IFA Shield 2019-20.
On 10 January 2021, Lukman made his debut for Real Kashmir in I-League against Manipur based club TRAU FC, which ended as 1-1 draw.

South Africa
On 1 October 2021, Lukman signed with second tier of South African football club, Free State Stars.

Honours
Real Kashmir
IFA Shield: 2020

CD Maxaquene
Taça de Moçambique: 2016

Individual
IFA Shield Top Scorer/MVP: 2020

References

External links

1994 births
Living people
Nigerian footballers
Liga Portugal 2 players
Varzim S.C. players
Real Kashmir FC players
Association football forwards
Moçambola players
Oman Professional League players
I-League players
Nigerian expatriate footballers
Expatriate footballers in India
Nigerian expatriate sportspeople in Mozambique
Nigerian expatriate sportspeople in India